Charles Wayne Osborne Jr. (November 2, 1973 – October 16, 2012) was an American football defensive tackle who played five seasons in the National Football League (NFL) with the St. Louis Rams and Oakland Raiders. He was drafted by the St. Louis Rams in the seventh round of the 1996 NFL Draft.  The 1996 NFL combine scored "Chuck" the strongest at 33 reps (225 lb). He played college football at the University of Arizona with the famed "Desert Swarm" defense and attended Canyon High School in Santa Clarita, California. Osborne was also a member of the Amsterdam Admirals, Green Bay Packers, and the New England Patriots. He died at his home in La Jolla, California on October 16, 2012. His cause of death was listed as "CTE and obesity-related hypertensive cardiomyopathy."

References

 https://nflcombineresults.com/playerpage.php?f=Chuck&l=Osborne&i=23358
 http://tucsoncitizen.com/wildcatreport/2012/10/17/chuck-osborne-unsung-hero-of-arizonas-desert-swarm-dies-at-38/
 https://www.facebook.com/charleswayneosborne/
 https://www.foxsports.com/arizona/story/desert-swarm-mourns-tough-guy-osborne-101712

External links
Just Sports Stats
Chuck Osborne at Find a Grave

1973 births
2012 deaths
Players of American football from Los Angeles
American football defensive tackles
Arizona Wildcats football players
St. Louis Rams players
Amsterdam Admirals players
Oakland Raiders players
Deaths from hypertension
Georgia Force players
Burials at Forest Lawn Memorial Park (Hollywood Hills)
Deaths from cardiomyopathy
American football players with chronic traumatic encephalopathy
Deaths from dementia in California